Waitakere United was a football club based in Waitakere City, New Zealand. They were one of the franchises in the ISPS Handa Premiership. They played their home games at Fred Taylor Park in Kumeu and The Trusts Arena.

History
Waitakere United was formed as a special franchise club in 2004 to play in the New Zealand Football Championship (NZFC), New Zealand's top domestic football competition. The team represented 12 member clubs from Mt Albert to the Kaipara.

In the inaugural season (2004–05) of the NZFC, Waitakere United finished runners-up to the champions Auckland City but they followed up with a very disappointing 6th place in the next season. In the following season, however, Waitakere finished as NZFC premiers but lost in the grand final once again to Auckland City FC 3–2.

Due to the withdrawal of Vanuatu's Port Vila Sharks, Waitakere was given a berth in the inaugural OFC Champions League, for 2007, as NZFC premiers. They finished atop their group, edging out Auckland City and New Caledonia's AS Mont-Dore. They went on to defeat Ba FC of Fiji in the final, becoming the first OFC-League champions. Commins Menapi scored a crucial away goal that proved the difference as the tie finished 2–2 in aggregate. Taking this championship qualified United to compete in the 2007 FIFA Club World Cup in Japan, where they lost in the 'play-in' match to Sepahan 1–3.

Waitakere United defended their championship in capturing the 2007–08 OFC Champions League, defeating Kossa in the final 6–3 in goal aggregate. During this season, Douglas Field was under extensive renovation forcing Waitakere United to play most of their home fixtures at Fred Taylor Park in Whenuapai.

Waitakere had a notable rivalry with neighbours Auckland City. With the change of structure of football in New Zealand at the start of 2021, and the creation of the new New Zealand National League, this saw the end of Waitakere United, and consequently the end of the Auckland Derby.

Honours
New Zealand Football Championship
Championship (5): 2007–08, 2009-10, 2010-11, 2011-12, 2012-13
Premiership (5): 2006–07, 2007–08, 2008–09, 2010-11, 2012–13 
OFC Champions League (2): 2007, 2007–08
ASB National Youth League (2): 2008, 2011
ASB Phoenix Challenge: 2010
ASB Charity Cup: 2012

Performance in OFC competitions
OFC Champions League: 7 appearances
Best: Champions in 2007 and 2007–08
2007: Champions
2007–08: Champions
2008–09: 2° in Group A
2009–10: Finalist
2010–11: 2° in Group B
2011–12: 2° in Group A
2012–13: Finalist

FIFA Club World Cup History

Current squad
As of 23 January 2021

Staff
Youth Team Coach:  Mark Holt
Goalkeeper coach:  Kevin O'Leary

Managers
 Chris Milicich (2004–05)
 Steve Cain (1 July 2006 – 30 June 2007)
 Chris Milicich (1 July 2007 – 30 June 2009)
 Neil Emblen (1 July 2009 – 30 June 2012)
 Paul Marshall (1 July 2012 – 30 June 2013)
 Paul Temple &  Brian Shelley(1 July 2013–15)
 Chris Milicich (2015 – 2019)
 Paul Hobson (30 November 2019 – Present)

References

External links
Official site
Stadium Website
New Zealand Football Championship Official Site

 
Association football clubs in Auckland
Association football clubs established in 2004
2004 establishments in New Zealand
OFC Champions League winning clubs
Sport in West Auckland, New Zealand